Dragoje (Cyrillic: Драгоје) is a masculine given name of Slavic origin. It may refer to:

Dragoje Leković (born 1967), retired football goalkeeper

See also
Dragojević, a surname
Dragojevići, a village
Dragojevac (disambiguation)

Slavic masculine given names
Serbian masculine given names